The Comoros green pigeon (Treron griveaudi) is a bird in the family Columbidae. It was previously thought to be conspecific with the Madagascar green pigeon (Treron australis).

Geographic Range

Treron griveaudi is currently known only from the island of Mwali in the Comoros, although it is considered likely that it was present on Ngazidja and Nzwani in the past.

Habitat

The Comoros green pigeon is found in evergreen forest, secondary forest and coconut plantations at higher elevations.

Conservation

Despite being legally protected, poaching is still suspected. Suitable forest only remains on 5% of the island and introduced species such as rats may predate nests. The population is thought to number fewer than 2,500 individuals.

References

Treron
Birds described in 1960
Taxa named by Constantine Walter Benson